Eli Sabiá Filho (born 31 August 1988) is a Brazilian professional footballer who plays as a defender for Indian Super League club Jamshedpur.

Career 
Eli Sabiá began his career with Paulista and joined in July 2007 to Lausanne on loan; he joined back to Paulista on 29 January 2009.

On 14 May 2009 Santos have signed central defender Sabiá on loan from Paulista.

Sabiá profoundly played for Indian Super League side Chennaiyin whereby he had two time contract with the side.He was appointed as the vice-captain of the team for 2020-21 season and became captain in January 2021 after appointed captain Rafael Crivellaro ruled out of the season with ankle injury.

In July 2021, Eli Sabiá signed with another Indian Super League side Jamshedpur.The club announced his signing on 31 August 2021.

Honours

Jamshedpur
Indian Super League Premiers: 2021-22

References

External links

1988 births
Living people
Footballers from São Paulo (state)
Association football central defenders
Brazilian footballers
Brazilian expatriate footballers
Expatriate footballers in Switzerland
Campeonato Brasileiro Série A players
Campeonato Brasileiro Série B players
Paulista Futebol Clube players
FC Lausanne-Sport players
Santos FC players
Club Athletico Paranaense players
Associação Desportiva São Caetano players
Brasiliense Futebol Clube players
Criciúma Esporte Clube players
Botafogo Futebol Clube (SP) players
Sampaio Corrêa Futebol Clube players
Saudi Professional League players
Al-Raed FC players
Brazilian expatriate sportspeople in Saudi Arabia
Expatriate footballers in Saudi Arabia
Jamshedpur FC players
People from Mogi Guaçu